Keiko Nakagomi (born 12 June 1970) is a Japanese archer. She competed at the 1988 Summer Olympics and the 1992 Summer Olympics.

References

1970 births
Living people
Japanese female archers
Olympic archers of Japan
Archers at the 1988 Summer Olympics
Archers at the 1992 Summer Olympics
Sportspeople from Tokyo
20th-century Japanese women